Daniel Borgmeyer is an American businessman and current mayor of St. Charles, Missouri. Borgmeyer is a fourth generation, lifelong resident of Saint Charles.   He is a Vietnam combat veteran who started his own marketing firm known as Borgmeyer Marketing Group in Saint Charles in 1973 with two employees. Borgmeyer was president of the Saint Charles Chamber of Commerce, County Council of Chambers and Saint Charles Cable TV and Tourism Commissions.  He was a board member of the Saint Charles County Road Board and East-West Gateway Coordinating Council.  He was also on the advisory boards of both Centerre and Frontenac Banks.

Education 
Borgmeyer is a graduate of Duchesne High School and attended UMSL and Washington University.

Mayoral term 
In an interview with KMOV News, Borgmeyer stated that he wanted to take a pro-business stance and curb crime during his time as mayor of St. Charles. Borgmeyer also believes that the police force is currently understaffed stating “As far as I'm concerned we’re understaffed police wise I'd like to see the police force expanded They're coming up for contract negotiations, that's an important part of it.”

Borgmeyer pushed for the repeal of a controversial St. Charles liquor law that required businesses on North Main Street to make at least 50% of their revenues come from food and not liquor. He says that the requirement does not make the area safer but rather could force some places to close as a result. Borgmeyer also believes that the food requirement is keeping new businesses from coming to North Main. He says that better lighting and more policing have made North Main safer, not the ordinance.

Electoral history

References 

Mayors of St. Charles, Missouri